Rostyslav Rusyn (born 26 October 1995) is a professional Ukrainian football midfielder who plays for Metalist 1925 Kharkiv.

Club career
Rusyn is a product of Youth Sportive school in his native Zhydachiv (first trainer was Volodymyr Sapuha) and also RVUFK Kyiv and Shakhtar Donetsk youth sportive school systems.

After spent five seasons in the Shakhtar youth team and played in the Ukrainian Premier League Reserves, he was transferred to Latvia. Returned to Ukraine and signed a contract with Rukh Lviv in August 2018.

International career
Rusyn was called up to the Ukraine national under-16 football team in October 2010 and played as a second-half substituted player in the 2-1 winning match against Denmark on October 14, 2020 in the International youth tournament in Latina, Lazio, Italy.

Personal life
Rusyn is a stepbrother of another Ukrainian football players, Volodymyr Fedoriv (born 1985) and Vitaliy Fedoriv (born 1987).

References

External links
 
 

1995 births
Living people
People from Zhydachiv
Piddubny Olympic College alumni
Ukrainian footballers
FC Shakhtar Donetsk players
FK Spartaks Jūrmala players
FC Rukh Lviv players
FC Metalist 1925 Kharkiv players
Ukrainian expatriate footballers
Expatriate footballers in Latvia
Ukrainian expatriate sportspeople in Latvia
Ukrainian Premier League players
Association football midfielders
Ukrainian First League players
Ukraine youth international footballers